Caloptilia prismatica is a moth of the family Gracillariidae. It is known from Sri Lanka.

This species has a wingspan of 13–15 mm, head and thorax are greyish-ochreous, mixed with dark grey.
Forewings are dark greyish-ochreous, with prismatic violet or blue reflections, strewn with numerous small blackish dots in longitudinal series.

References

prismatica
Moths of Sri Lanka
Moths described in 1907